Dirkir Kohn Glay (born 1 January 1992) is a Liberian professional footballer who plays for Liberian First Division club LISCR FC.

References

External links

1992 births
Living people
KF Tirana players
Association football defenders
Liberian footballers
Liberia international footballers
Liberian expatriate footballers
Liberian expatriate sportspeople in Indonesia
Liga 1 (Indonesia) players
Expatriate footballers in Indonesia